Joe Lukeman (16 August 1901 – 5 May 1993) was  a former Australian rules footballer who played with Footscray in the Victorian Football League (VFL).

Notes

External links 
		

1901 births
1993 deaths
Australian rules footballers from South Australia
Western Bulldogs players
West Adelaide Football Club players